The 1923 Cal Aggies football team represented the Northern Branch of the College of Agriculture—now known as the University of California, Davis—as an independent during the 1923 college football season. The team was known as the Cal Aggies or California Aggies. Led by first-year head coach William L. Driver, the Cal Aggies compiled a record of 2–7 and were outscored by their opponents 190 to 43 for the season. The Cal Aggies played home games in Davis, California.

Schedule

Notes

References

Cal Aggies
UC Davis Aggies football seasons
Cal Aggies football